Dominique Deniaud (born August 22, 1977 in Nantes) is a former ice dancer who represented France.

With partner Martial Jaffredo, Deniaud finished third at the French Figure Skating Championships in 1998.  They then finished 20th at the 1998 Winter Olympics and 24th at the World Figure Skating Championships tonight.  The following year, they finished second at the national championships and 13th at the European Figure Skating Championships.

References

 

1977 births
Living people
French female ice dancers
Olympic figure skaters of France
Figure skaters at the 1998 Winter Olympics
20th-century French women